The 110th United States Congress enacted the following laws:

Summary of actions

President George W. Bush vetoed the following acts of this Congress. (List of United States presidential vetoes#George W. Bush).

 May 1, 2007: Vetoed , U.S. Troop Readiness, Veterans' Care, Katrina Recovery, and Iraq Accountability Appropriations Act, 2007. Override attempt failed in House, 222–203. A later version of the bill that excluded certain aspects of the initial legislation that the president disapproved of H.R. 2206, was enacted as Pub.L. 110–28 with the president's approval.
 June 20, 2007: Vetoed , Stem Cell Research Enhancement Act of 2007. No override attempt made.
 October 3, 2007: Vetoed , Children's Health Insurance Program Reauthorization Act of 2007 ("SCHIP"). Override attempt failed in House, 273–156.
 November 2, 2007: Vetoed , Water Resources Development Act of 2007. Overridden by House, 361–54. Overridden by Senate, 79–14 (62 needed), and enacted as Pub.L. 110–114 over the president's veto.
 November 13, 2007: Vetoed , Departments of Labor, Health and Human Services, and Education, and Related Agencies Appropriations Act of 2008. Override attempt failed in House, 277–141.
 December 12, 2007: Vetoed , Children's Health Insurance Program Reauthorization Act of 2007. Override attempt failed in House, 260–152.
 December 28, 2007: Vetoed , National Defense Authorization Act for Fiscal Year 2008. No override attempt made. A later version of the bill that changed a minor provision of which the president disapproved was quickly passed by Congress (H.R. 4986) and was enacted with the president's approval as Pub.L. 110–181 on January 28, 2008.
 March 8, 2008: Vetoed , Intelligence Authorization Act for Fiscal Year 2008. Override attempt failed in House, 225–188.
 May 21, 2008: Vetoed , 2007 U.S. Farm Bill. re-passed by Congress to correct a clerical error in HR 2419. Overridden by House, 317–109. Overridden by Senate, 80–14. Enacted as Pub.L. 110–246 over the president's veto. Due to a clerical error, this act was repealed by Pub.L. 110-246.
 June 18, 2008: Vetoed , 2007 U.S. Farm Bill. re-passed by Congress to correct a clerical error in HR 2419. Overridden by House, 317–109. Overridden by Senate, 80–14. Enacted as Pub.L. 110–246 over the president's veto. Due to a clerical error, this act was repealed by Pub.L. 110-246.
 July 15, 2008: Vetoed , Medicare Improvements for Patients and Providers Act of 2008. Overridden by House, 383–41. Overridden by Senate, 70–26. Enacted as Pub.L. 110–275 over the president's veto.

Public laws

Private laws
No private laws have been enacted during this Congress.

Treaties ratified
The following treaties have been ratified in the 110th Congress:

See also 
List of United States federal legislation
List of acts of the 109th United States Congress
List of acts of the 111th United States Congress

References

External links 

 Public Laws for the 110th Congress at Congress.gov
 Private Laws for the 110th Congress at Congress.gov
 

110